was a Japanese professional sumo wrestler from Ichikawa, Chiba Prefecture. He was the sport's 21st yokozuna and the first official yokozuna from the Osaka Sumo Association.

Early life and career
His date of birth has been dated either August 2, 1874 or January 19, 1876. His master died while he was promoted to juryō, and he had to be transferred to Tomozuna stable.
While touring in Ōgaki, Gifu Prefecture, he was hit by the Great Nōbi Earthquake and was only alive thanks to the efforts of his brother, Tatekō, who however died in the earthquake. He reached the top makuuchi division in 1896, peaking at maegashira 7 and never reaching sanyaku. 
Tatekō was really popular among the public. Being renown as handsome, and having a good voice, he was popular with the ladies and was a regular member of the pleasure quarters. This affected his training and Tatekō never practiced much. In the hope of arousing a burst of pride in Tatekō, his master transmitted to him his master's old shikona: . After he contracted smallpox and was unable to budge, he escaped from Tokyo-sumo, cut his topknot, and entered the Kusakaze stable in Kyoto, then moved to the Nakamura stable in Osaka, where he settled.
In the Osaka Sumo Association, Wakashima knew a rapid ascent. He was quickly promoted to komusubi and reached the ōzeki rank in 1901.

Yokozuna career
A the time he was the only wrestler active in Osaka sumo to ever receive this recognition. In June 1903, he fought against wrestlers in Tokyo sumo. He gave a very strong performance, defeating yokozuna Umegatani Tōtarō II and emerged as a threat to the dominance of the strongest yokozuna in Tokyo sumo, Hitachiyama.

Retirement from sumo
Following a bicycle accident in 1905, he contracted a head injury and declared himself kyūjō for the whole 1906 year. In 1907, his condition was worsening to the point that his brain would not support a bout against another yokozuna and Wakashima chose to retire. 
After his retirement, he once became a chairman of the Osaka Sumo Association, but soon after, he chose to run a theatrical troupe and became an entertainer. However, management was left roughly to others, and by the beginning of the Taishō era (1912-1926), he had reached a dead end in his touring activities. In 1925, he was elected as a town councilor of Yonago, Tottori Prefecture.
On his way to the Sumo Association in Tokyo, he suffered a cerebral hemorrhage in Kobe and died on October 23, 1943.

Fighting style
Although he was not able to beat Tokyo yokozuna Hitachiyama, he had gained enough strength to be able to compete with Ōzutsu and Umegatani on equal footing and is considered a leading figure in the revival of Osaka-sumo. His flashy ring style, which included powerful pulling throws, and the sharpness of his strong thrusts, made him a threat even to Tokyo-sumo top wrestlers.

Top Division Record

Tokyo sumo top division record

Osaka sumo top division record
Osaka sumo existed independently for many years before merging with Tokyo sumo in 1926. 1–2 tournaments were held yearly, though the actual time they were held was often erratic.
In his first Osaka tournament Wakashima competed at makuuchi, but was unranked.

    
    
  
 
    
    
  

    
    
  

    
    
  

    
    
  

    
    
  

    
    
  

    
    
  

    
    
  

    

*Championships for the best record in a tournament were not recognized or awarded in Osaka sumo before its merger with Tokyo sumo, and the unofficial championships above are historically conferred. For more information, see yūshō.

See also
Glossary of sumo terms
List of past sumo wrestlers
List of yokozuna

References

1876 births
1943 deaths
Japanese sumo wrestlers
Yokozuna
People from Ichikawa, Chiba
Sumo people from Chiba Prefecture